Zaw Lin (born 14 May 1992) is a Burmese professional footballer who plays as a defender for Ayeyawady United F.C. and Myanmar national football team.

References

External links 

1992 births
Living people
Burmese footballers
Myanmar international footballers
Association football midfielders